Buell Peak is a small 5,756 ft (1,754 m) summit located in Mount Rainier National Park in Pierce County of Washington state. It is part of the Cascade Range and is situated 1.5 miles southwest of Cayuse Pass and 0.53 mile east-southeast of Barrier Peak, which is its nearest higher peak. The normal climbing access is from the Owyhigh Lakes Trail. The peak's name honors John Latimore Buell who arrived in Orting, Washington in 1890 and went into the hardware business.

Climate

Buell Peak is located in the marine west coast climate zone of western North America. Most weather fronts originate in the Pacific Ocean, and travel northeast toward the Cascade Mountains. As fronts approach, they are forced upward by the peaks of the Cascade Range (Orographic lift), causing them to drop their moisture in the form of rain or snowfall onto the Cascades. As a result, the west side of the North Cascades experiences high precipitation, especially during the winter months in the form of snowfall. During winter months, weather is usually cloudy, but, due to high pressure systems over the Pacific Ocean that intensify during summer months, there is often little or no cloud cover during the summer. Because of maritime influence, snow tends to be wet and heavy, resulting in high avalanche danger. Precipitation runoff from Buell Peak drains into tributaries of the Cowlitz River.

References

External links
 Buell Peak weather forecast
 National Park Service web site: Mount Rainier National Park

Cascade Range
Mountains of Pierce County, Washington
Mountains of Washington (state)
Mount Rainier National Park
North American 1000 m summits